{{Infobox military unit
| unit_name                     = Logistical Support of the Russian Armed Forces
| image                         = 
| caption                       = 
| dates                         = 2010 – present
| country                       = Russian Federation
| branch                        = Russian Armed Forces
| type                          = 
| role                          = 
| command_structure             = 
| garrison                      = Moscow
| nickname                      = 
| patron                        = Joseph Volotsky
| motto                         = ''"Никто лучше нас!' (Nobody is better than us!)
| march                         = 
| anniversaries                 = 1 August
| battles                       = Russian military intervention in the Syrian civil war2022 Russian invasion of Ukraine
| website                       = https://mto.ric.mil.ru/
| commander1                    = Colonel-General Mikhail Mizintsev
| identification_symbol         = 
| identification_symbol_label   = Flag
}}Logistical Support of the Russian Armed Forces or MTO''' are a unified system of command and control bodies, institutions and other military organizations that provide technical and logistical support for all branches of the Russian Armed Forces. The MTO system of the Russian Armed Forces combines 2 previously independent types of comprehensive support: technical and logistical, both of which existed in the structure of the Rear of the Russian Armed Forces up until it was dissolved in 2010. The management of Logistical Support is entrusted to the central bodies of military command, subordinate to the Deputy Minister of Defense, Colonel-General Mikhail Mizintsev.

Deputy Defense Minister for logistics Army General Dmitry Bulgakov was replaced by Colonel-General Mikhail Mizintsev, the previous head of the MoD's National Defense Management Center.

Composition 
The structure of the Central Office of the Logistics Department of the Armed Forces of Russia:

 Logistics Headquarters of the Armed Forces of the Russian Federation
 Department of Transport Support of the Ministry of Defense
 Department of Operational Maintenance and Provision of Utilities for Military Units and Organizations of the Ministry of Defense
 Food Directorate of the Ministry of Defense
 Main Armored Directorate of the Ministry of Defense
 Main Missile and Artillery Directorate of the Ministry of Defense
 Main Directorate of the Chief of the Railway Troops
 Metrology Department of the Russian Armed Forces

Educational institutions 
The training of MTO specialists is carried out by the Military Logistics Academy.

Current agencies 
The agencies under the MTO include:

 Road Troops
 Railway Troops
 Pipeline Troops

See also 

 Belarusian Transport Troops
 United States Army Logistics Branch
 :ru:Строительные войска - Soviet and Russian Construction Troops

References 

Military units and formations of Russia
2010 establishments in Russia
Military logistics of Russia